The 2002 AVC Cup Men's Club Tournament was the 4th staging of the AVC Club Championships. The tournament was held in Azadi Volleyball Hall, Tehran, Iran. Paykan of Iran won the tournament after beating Sanam.

Preliminary round

Pool A

|}

|}

Pool B

|}

|}

Classification 5th–6th

|}

Final round

Semifinals

|}

3rd place

|}

Final

|}

Final standing

Awards
MVP:  Behnam Mahmoudi (Paykan)
Best Scorer:  Amir Singh (Al-Rayyan)
Best Spiker:  Mohammad Torkashvand (Sanam)
Best Server:  Amir Hosseini (Sanam)
Best Blocker:  Danil Siminov (Atyrau)
Best Libero:  Katsutoshi Tsumagari (Suntory)
Best Setter:  Hossein Maadani (Paykan)

References
Asian Volleyball Confederation
  Results

A
Volleyball
International volleyball competitions hosted by Iran